Urbainville is a community in the Canadian province of Prince Edward Island, located in Lot 16 of Prince County, northwest of Summerside.

Communities in Prince County, Prince Edward Island